PlayNation is an online video game developer, headquartered in Carlsbad, California, United States, and founded in 1997. They helped develop the EA SPORTS Tiger Woods 1999 Internet Viewer, which allowed spectators to watch online golf tournaments over the internet live. PlayNation also developed other various online game properties, such as SportsCorps. They were acquired by Electronic Arts on September 8, 1999.

References

External links
 Official homepage of Electronic Arts

American companies established in 1997
1997 establishments in California
Electronic Arts
Companies based in Carlsbad, California
Video game companies established in 1997
Video game development companies
1999 mergers and acquisitions